San Antonio de Putina Province is a province of the Puno Region in Peru.

Political division 
The province measures  and is divided into five districts:

Geography 
The Apolobamba mountain range traverses the province. Wisk'achani (Chawpi Urqu), the highest mountain of the range, lies on the border with Bolivia. Other peaks of the province are listed below:

Ethnic groups 
The people in the province are mainly indigenous citizens of Quechua descent. Quechua is the language which the majority of the population (60.23%) learnt to speak in childhood, 30.24% of the residents started speaking using the Spanish language and  9.37% using Aymara  (2007 Peru Census).

See also 
 Chullpaqucha
 Ch'uxñaquta

References 

Provinces of the Puno Region